Lihou Reef National Nature Reserve is a former marine protected area covering an area of 8440 km2 in the Australian Coral Sea Islands Territory  that was incorporated into the new Coral Sea Commonwealth Marine Reserve in December 2012.   Together with the Coringa-Herald National Nature Reserve, from which it is separated by about 100 km of open ocean, it forms the Coral Sea Reserves Ramsar Site, designated on 16 August 2002, listing it under the Ramsar Convention as a wetland of international importance.

History
Lihou Reef and its cays were discovered by Lieutenant John Lihou, R.N., on 23 February 1823. Lihou, then Master of the brig-sloop HMS Zenobia, was on passage from Manila to South America. After a hazardous passage through the reef, the ship departed the Great Barrier Reef via an opening near Murray Islands. On 23 February, the Lihou Reefs were sighted.

Description

Lihou Reef is the second largest atoll by total size in the Coral Sea, after the Chesterfield Islands (not counting the completely submerged Lansdowne Bank in the easternmost reaches of the Coral Sea). It is U-shaped, with an opening in the south-west. The size of the lagoon is about 100 by 30 km, with an area of 2529 km2, making the atoll one of the largest in the world. Nevertheless, the total land area of the islets and cays is little more than a square kilometre. The lagoon is up to 60 m deep.  The reserve contains 18 islets and cays, 9 each on the Northern Rim and the Southern Rim, ranging in size from 5,000 to 168,000 m2.

Northern Rim
Total land area 560,000 m2; the islets on the Northern Rim are, from southwest to northeast (clockwise):

 Juliette Cay (78,000 m2)
 Kathy Cay (40,000 m2)
 Lorna Cay (168,000 m2)
 Little Margaret Cay (10,000 m2)
 Margaret Cay (30,000 m2)
 Turtle Islet (31,000 m2)
 Middle Cay (78,000 m2)
 Observatory Cay (88,000 m2)
 Licklick Cay (40,000 m2)

Only Lorna Cay and Turtle Islet are vegetated. Turtle Islet reaches a height of 6 m, and Observatory Cay 2 m.

Southern Rim
Total land area 470,000 m2.

The islets on the Southern Rim are, from northeast to southwest (clockwise):

 Anne Cay, "No 1 Cay" (112,000 m2)
 Betty Cay, "No 2 Cay" (37,000 m2)
 Carol Cay, "No 3 Cay" (5,000 m2)
 Dianna Cay, "No 4 Cay" (16,000 m2)
 Fanny Cay, "No 5 Cay" (7,000 m2)
 Edna Cay, "No 6 Cay" (73,000 m2)
 Helen Cay, "No 7 Cay" (10,000 m2)
 Georgina Cay, "No 8 Cay" (105,000 m2)
 Nellie Cay, "No 9 Cay" (104,000 m2)

Only the largest three of the Southern Rim, Anne Cay, Georgina Cay and Nellie Cay, are vegetated. Just northeast of Anne Cay is the Herald Passage into the lagoon.

References

External links
 

Coral Sea Islands
Former protected areas of the Australian government
Protected areas established in 2002
Protected areas disestablished in 2012
2002 establishments in Australia
2012 disestablishments in Australia
Lighthouses in Coral Sea Islands